"Mr. Jester" is a science fiction short story by American writer Fred Saberhagen. It was first published in If, in 1966.

Plot summary
After a society without humor exiles their only comedian to the outskirts of the solar system, he becomes the only one who can save them from being destroyed by a Berserker.

Reception
"Mr. Jester" was a finalist for the 1967 Hugo Award for Best Short Story.

References

External links
Text of the story at the Baen Free Library

1966 short stories
Science fiction short stories
Works originally published in If (magazine)